Digboi (IPA: ˈdɪgˌbɔɪ) is a town and a town area committee in Tinsukia district in the north-eastern part of the state of Assam, India

Crude oil was discovered here in late 19th century and first oil well was dug in 1866. Digboi is known as the Oil City of Assam where the first oil well in Asia was drilled. The first refinery was started here as early as 1901. Digboi has the oldest oil well in operation. With a significant number of British professionals working for Assam Oil Company until the decade following independence of India, Digboi had a well-developed infrastructure and a number of bungalows unique to the town. It has eighteen holes golf course as part of the Digboi Club. It has guest houses and tourist residential apartments laid on Italian architectural plan to promote tourism in upper Assam.

Etymology
Barely seven years after Edwin L. Drake drilled the world's first oil well in 1859 at Titusville, Pennsylvania in the United States, history registered another exploration of the black liquid gold, in the largest continent. More than a century ago, history was made in a remote corner of Assam in the midst of the dense and malaria infested jungles, by a band of intrepid pioneers searching for black gold. In 1867 Italian Engineers, commissioned by the Assam Railways and Trading Company, to build a railway line from Dibrugarh to Margherita (Headquarters of Assam Railways and Trading Company) accidentally discovered oil at Digboi around 10 miles from Margherita. "'Dig boy, dig', shouted the Canadian engineer, Mr W L Lake, at his men as they watched elephants emerging out of the dense forest with oil stains on their feet".
This is possibly the most distilled – though fanciful – version of the legend explaining the siting and naming of Digboi. Two events separated by seven years have become fused, but although neither is likely to be provable, such evidence that does exist appears sufficiently detailed to be credible. Various web sites offer variations on the elephant's foot story, a consensus of which would be that engineers extending the Dibru-Sadiya railway line to Ledo for the Assam Railways and Trading Company (AR&TC) in 1882 were using elephants for haulage and noticed that the mud on one pachyderm's feet smelled of oil. Retracing the trail of footprints, they found oil seeping to the surface. One of the engineers, the Englishman (not Canadian) Willie Leova Lake, was an 'oil enthusiast' and persuaded the company to drill a well. Oil India Ltd's web site contains no history of the Assam Oil Company's origins but an earlier incarnation claimed that the "decision to drill was taken by the Directors of the AR&T Co. in 1888 under the direction of Mr. W L Lake, an employee of the company and an oil enthusiast". Once the project had been approved, Lake assembled equipment, boilers, and local labour, and engaged elephants to haul the machinery to the site. The first well was started in September 1889, but an encouraging first strike at  turned out to be a small pocket, and drilling recommenced.

Digboi as an oil town
It is said that the town gets its name from the phrase "dig-boy-dig," which is what the English and Canadian miners told the labourers as they dug for crude oil. It is said that Canadians first noticed oil on the feet of elephants. That's how oil was discovered here. The town's history begins in 1867 when a small group of men from the Assam Railway and Trading Co. found their elephants' legs soaked in black mud, that smelled somewhat like oil. The men began exploring more, and in 1889, the English started a small oil installation. India (and Asia) obtained its first refinery in Digboi in the year 1901. Assam Oil Company was formed in 1899 to look after the running of the oil business in this area. The field was pushed to produce the maximum amount of oil with little regard to reservoir management; as a result, production started to drop almost immediately after the war. In 1989, the Department of Posts, India came out with a stamp commemorating 100 years of the Digboi fields.

Today, though the crude production is not high, Digboi has the distinction of being India's oldest continuously producing oilfield. Digboi refinery, now a division of Indian Oil Corporation, had a capacity of about 0.65 million tonnes per year as of 2003.

Digboi is now Headquarter of Assam Oil Division of Indian Oil Corporation Limited. The Earliest recorded to the existence of oil in India is found in the memories and dispatches of the Army Officers who penetrated the jungles of Upper Assam since 1825. Lt. R. Wilcox, Major A. White, Capt. Francis Jenkins, Capt. P.S. Hanney—they all saw at different times petroleum exuding from banks of the Dihing River. Mr. C.A. Bruce (1828) and Mr. H.B. Medicott (1865) of the Geological Survey of India also saw oil while prospecting for coal in Upper Assam.

In 1939, there was a major labour union strike in the Refinery. The Gandhi Movement of Congress for Indian Independence struggle; backed by labour rights and equality status was headed by Sardar Amar Singh Marwah. The break of the World War II coincided with the Digboi labour strike resulted in harsh steps taken by the British Administrative offices to crush the strike. The Viceroy and the Governor had intervened to bring a settlement adopting sturdy steps were take to crush the union by shooting down of the president of the labour union to be followed by issuing orders of Quit Digboi, Quit Lakhimpur and finally Quit Assam to the leaders of the labour union.

Digboi Refinery 

The Digboi Refinery modernization project was taken up in large-scale in order to overcome the technological obsolescence of the old refinery. Subsequently, a number of other major projects were undertaken by Assam Oil Division to further revamp and modernise Digboi Refinery.Digboi refinery has been awarded the ISO-14001 and OHSMC certificate.

Geography
Digboi is located at 27°22'48.0"N 95°37'48.0"E. It has an average elevation of 165 metres (541 ft).It is situated 510 km north east of Guwahati.

Demographics
 India census, Digboi has population of 21,736 of which 10,964 are males while 10,772 are females. Population of Children with age of 0-6 is 1745 which is 8.03% of total population of Digboi.  Committee, Female Sex Ratio is of 982 against state average of 958. Moreover, Child Sex Ratio in Digboi is around 981 compared to Assam state average of 962. Literacy rate of Digboi city is 92.08% higher than state average of 72.19%. In Digboi, Male literacy is around 95.09% while female literacy rate is 89.02%.

Digboi city have a population of 21,736 as per 2011 census. Bengali is spoken by 12,135, Assamese is spoken by 3,845, Hindi is spoken by 3,440, Nepali is spoken by 1,381 and 941 speaks other languages.

Digboi Oil Town was considered as a separate census town in 2011 India census. The population is largely heterogeneous. Assamese, Bengali, Nepali, Bihari, Marwari communities form the majority. People from various tribes such as the tea-tribes (brought in by the colonial planters as indentured labourers from the Chhotanagpur plateau region), Bodos, Mishings etc. have also made it their home.

Culture & economy
As being a small part of the diverse state Assam. It is culturally diverse with Assamese, Bengali and Nepali culture and heritage. As being colonised by British and rising of industrial era the place have seen adverse changes. Workers, labourers were brought in. Digboi township accounted for diverse group of people that entered in search of livelihood. But the outskirts were still agriculture based. Assam being rich in fertility, tea is produced throughout the place bringing a bright opportunity to the people and the place itself. Yet small people here portrait the picture of the nation itself.

How to reach Digboi 

The nearest airport is the Mohanbari Airport, Dibrugarh and the nearest railway junction is the Tinsukia Junction. One can get flight to Dibrugarh from Delhi and Kolkata on daily basis. Also Dibrugarh-New Delhi Rajdhani express runs daily from Dibrugarh via New Tinsukia Junction. There are also proper roadways which link the Digboi Oil town to some other towns like Duliajan, Makum etc.
Digboi has got a railway station and it connects well with Guwahati. 
Digboi can be reached by public transport bus and mini-vans as well. Buses between Digboi and other neighbouring towns and Guwahati are run by various companies. Rickshaw is the main mode of transport within the city.

Education

Colleges
 Digboi College
 Digboi Mahila Mahavidyalaya

Places of interest 

Digboi Oil Centenary Museum
Digboi War Cemetery
Digboi 18 hole Golf Course
Digboi Oil Field
Digboi Centenary Park
Digboi Bar

Politics
Digboi is part of Dibrugarh (Lok Sabha constituency) which is represented by Mr Rameswar Teli of Bharatiya Janata Party.It lies in the Digboi Constituency of the State Assembly where it is represented by Mr. Suren Phukan of Bharatiya Janata Party.

See also
Digboi Refinery
Bombay High

References

External links 

  The Oil Town of Digboi
 Tinsukia District Homepage

Cities and towns in Tinsukia district
Tinsukia
Assam

bpy:ডিকবলি অয়েল টাউন
new:डिग्बोइ ओइल टाउन
pt:Digboi Oil Town
sv:Tinsukia
vi:Digboi Oil Town